Benzophenone imine is an organic compound with the formula of (C6H5)2C=NH. A pale yellow liquid, benzophenone imine is used as a reagent in organic synthesis.

Synthesis 
Benzophenone imine can be prepared by the thermal decomposition of benzophenone oxime:
2(C6H5)2C=NOH  →  (C6H5)2C=NH  +  (C6H5)2C=O

Benzophenone imine can also be synthesized by addition of phenylmagnesium bromide to benzonitrile followed by careful hydrolysis (lest the imine be hydrolyzed):  
C6H5CN  +  C6H5MgBr   →  (C6H5)2C=NMgBr
(C6H5)2C=NMgBr  +  H2O  →  (C6H5)2C=NH  +  MgBr(OH)
This method is known as Moureu-Mignonac ketimine synthesis. 
Yet another route to benzophenone imine involves reaction of benzophenone and ammonia.

Reactions 
Benzophenone imine undergoes deprotonation with alkyl lithium reagents.
(C6H5)2C=NH  +  CH3Li  →  (C6H5)2C=NLi  +  CH4
(C6H5)2C=NLi  +  CH3I  →  (C6H5)2C=NCH3  +  LiI

Primary amines can be protected as benzophenone imines, and the protected amines are stable in flash chromatography.

Buchwald-Hartwig amination involves coupling aromatic halide and amine to form carbon-nitrogen bonds with the help of palladium-based catalysts. Benzophenone imine can be used as an ammonia-equivalent in such reactions.

References 

Imines